El Pino is a small community located on the Dajabón Province of the Dominican Republic. The most known and inhabited sector is el Sector Los Ramos, where the extensive Rodriguez- Ramos family and their descent live.

Populated places in Dajabón Province
Municipalities of the Dominican Republic